Neethipeedam is a 1977 Indian Malayalam-language film, directed by Crossbelt Mani. The film stars Madhu, Sheela, K. P. Ummer and Maniyanpilla Raju. The film has musical score by G. Devarajan. The film was a remake of the Tamil film Ezhai Padum Padu.

Cast
Madhu
Sheela
K. P. Ummer
Maniyanpilla Raju
Thikkurissy Sukumaran Nair

Soundtrack
The music was composed by G. Devarajan and the lyrics were written by Yusufali Kechery and Bharanikkavu Sivakumar.

References

External links
 

1977 films
Malayalam remakes of Tamil films
1970s Malayalam-language films